Potom is a village and a former municipality in Berat County, central Albania. At the 2015 local government reform it became a subdivision of the municipality Skrapar. The population at the 2011 census was 897.

Localities

The municipal unit Potom consists of the following villages:

 Backë
 Dyrmish
 Gërmenj
 Gjergjovë
 Helmës
 Koprënckë
 Melskë
 Nikollarë
 Potom
 Qafë
 Staraveckë
 Visockë

References

Former municipalities in Berat County
Administrative units of Skrapar
Villages in Berat County
Populated places disestablished in 2015